Interleukin-28 (IL-28) is a cytokine that comes in two isoforms, IL-28A and IL-28B, and plays a role in immune defense against viruses, including the induction of an "antiviral state" by turning on Mx proteins, 2',5'-oligoadenylate synthetase as well as ISGF3G (Interferon Stimulated Gene Factor 3). IL-28A and IL-28B belong to the type III interferon family of cytokines and are highly similar (in amino acid sequence) to IL-29.  Their classification as Interferons is due to their ability to induce an antiviral state, while their additional classification as cytokines is due to their chromosomal location as well as the fact that they are encoded by multiple exons, as opposed to a single exon, as most type-I IFNs are.

Discovery 

IL-28 was discovered in 2002 by Zymogenetics using a genomic screening process in which the entire human genome was scanned for putative genes.  Once these genes were found, a second scan was performed to look specifically for cytokines.  Both IL-28 and IL-29 were found in humans using this type of analysis.

Structure 

IL-28 genes are located near IL-29 on chromosome 19 in humans. The two isoforms of IL-28 (IL-28A and IL-28B) are 96% homologous. Differences in function between the two forms remains unclear.

The receptor for IL-28 is composed of a unique IL-28 Receptor Alpha chain which pairs with the IL-10 Receptor Beta chain, leading many to classify IL-28 as an IL-10-like family member.

Function 

IL-28 has also been shown to play a role in the adaptive immune response, as its inclusion as an immunoadjuvant during small animal vaccination lead to augmented antigen-specific Interferon Gamma release as well as an increased cytotoxic potential in CD8+ T cells.

Clinical significance 

Addition of IL-28 to vaccination results in 100% protection from a lethal H1N1 Influenza challenge in a small animal model when it was paired with an Influenza vaccine that protected only 50% of the time without IL-28.

Studies of IL-28B in non-human primate models of vaccination confirmed the small animal models, leading to an increase in Interferon Gamma production and CD8+ T cell activity in the form of cytotoxicity in an HIV vaccine study. Scientists have credited this link to explain why some people infected with HSV-1 experience cold sores, while others do not.

A single nucleotide polymorphism (SNP) near the IL28B gene predicts response to hepatitis C treatment with interferon and ribavirin. The SNP was identified in a genome-wide association study (GWAS) and is to date the best example of a successful GWAS hit that is clinically relevant.

References 

Interleukins